CKIA-FM is a French-language Canadian radio station located in Quebec City, Quebec.

The station operates under a community radio licence and is owned by a non-profit group known as Radio Basse-Ville.  It broadcasts on 88.3 MHz with an effective radiated power of 350 watts (class A) using an omnidirectional antenna, broadcasting from Edifice Marie-Guyart in downtown Quebec City.

CKIA-FM opened on October 31, 1984 and was originally on 96.1 MHz with a power of only 6.8 watts.  The station had to move to a new frequency to increase its power; the move and the power increase took place in September 2001, and the station then began stereophonic transmissions.  The 96.1 MHz frequency is now used by CBM-FM-2, a CBC Radio 2 station which is actually a rebroadcaster of Montreal station CBM-FM.

In 2016, the station premiered TransRéalité, the first radio program in Quebec devoted to transgender issues.

The station is a member of the Association des radiodiffuseurs communautaires du Québec.

References

External links
 www.ckiafm.org - CKIA FM 88,3
 
 

Kia
Kia
Kia
Radio stations established in 1984
1984 establishments in Quebec